The Chinese Ambassador to the Netherlands is the official representative of the People's Republic of China to the Netherlands.

List of representatives

Republic of China

People's Republic of China

See also
China–Netherlands relations

References 

Ambassadors of China to the Netherlands
Netherlands
China